Rotorua Lakes District or Rotorua District is a territorial authority district in the North Island of New Zealand. It has one urban area of significant size, the city of Rotorua. The district is governed by Rotorua Lakes Council, which is headquartered in Rotorua and is headed by a mayor. The district falls within two regional council areas, with the majority of the area and Rotorua city in the Bay of Plenty Region and the rest in the Waikato region. Tania Tapsell has been the mayor of Rotorua since the 2022 local elections.

History
Rotorua has an unusual history as the town was built by the Government as a tourist destination in the 1880s. Through the Rotorua Borough Act 1922, which achieved royal assent on 28 September 1922, the Rotorua Borough was formed. The inaugural elections for mayor were held in February 1923 and Cecil Clinkard was successful. In 1962, Rotorua was proclaimed a city. In 1979, the status was changed to a district when Rotorua City and Rotorua County amalgamated. The district council held its first meeting on 2 April 1979. At the 27 November 2014 council meeting, it was decided to change the operating name of the council to Rotorua Lakes Council, while the official name would remain unchanged. Since then, the district has been known as Rotorua Lakes and the council's web domain changed from www.rdc.govt.nz to rotorualakescouncil.nz.

Geography
The district's area is 61.52% in the Bay of Plenty region and 38.48% in the Waikato region. Adjacent districts (in a clockwise direction starting in the north) are Western Bay of Plenty, Whakatāne, Taupo, and South Waikato.

The Bay of Plenty portion of the district includes the settlements of Rotorua, Ngongotahā Valley, Mamaku, Hamurana, Mourea, Rotoiti Forest, Lake Rotoma, Lake Okareka, Lake Tarawera, Rerewhakaaitu, and Kaingaroa Forest. The Waikato portion includes the settlements of Waiotapu, Reporoa, Broadlands, Mihi, Waikite Valley, Ngakuru, and Atiamuri.

Demographics

Rotorua District had a population of 71,877 at the 2018 New Zealand census, an increase of 6,597 people (10.1%) since the 2013 census, and an increase of 5,976 people (9.1%) since the 2006 census. There were 25,056 households, comprising 35,148 males and 36,729 females, giving a sex ratio of 0.96 males per female. The median age was 36.4 years (compared with 37.4 years nationally), with 16,113 people (22.4%) aged under 15 years, 14,148 (19.7%) aged 15 to 29, 31,248 (43.5%) aged 30 to 64, and 10,365 (14.4%) aged 65 or older.

Ethnicities were 63.3% European/Pākehā, 40.1% Māori, 5.4% Pacific peoples, 9.5% Asian, and 1.6% other ethnicities. People may identify with more than one ethnicity.

The percentage of people born overseas was 17.8, compared with 27.1% nationally.

Although some people chose not to answer the census's question about religious affiliation, 49.9% had no religion, 35.0% were Christian, 3.1% had Māori religious beliefs, 1.8% were Hindu, 0.3% were Muslim, 0.5% were Buddhist and 2.5% had other religions.

Of those at least 15 years old, 9,876 (17.7%) people had a bachelor's or higher degree, and 10,434 (18.7%) people had no formal qualifications. The median income was $28,000, compared with $31,800 nationally. 7,122 people (12.8%) earned over $70,000 compared to 17.2% nationally. The employment status of those at least 15 was that 27,117 (48.6%) people were employed full-time, 8,541 (15.3%) were part-time, and 3,378 (6.1%) were unemployed.

Local government

Local council
Every three years, a mayor and the district councillors are elected in local elections. In the most recent elections in 2019, Steve Chadwick was re-elected as mayor and ten councillors were returned. Rotorua Lakes uses the first-past-the-post (FPP) voting system and elects its councillors at-large.

Sister cities
Rotorua has four sister cities:
  Klamath Falls, Oregon
  Beppu, Kyushu
  Lake Macquarie, New South Wales
  The Wuzhong District of Suzhou, China

References

External links

 
Politics of the Bay of Plenty Region
Politics of Waikato